The Hainan Volcanic Field is a  volcanic field covering the northern half of Hainan, People's Republic of China. Although mostly Pleistocene-Holocene in age, minor eruptions have been recorded in the 19th and 20th centuries.

Morphology
The field is made up of 58 Pleistocene-Holocene tholeiitic cones. The two best preserved cones (Leihuling and Ma'anshan) are on an East-West fracture line that contains 30 young cones in the Shishan and Yongzing regions. Historically, small fissure eruptions have been recorded from the Lingao and Chengmai areas.

Eruptions
Two eruptions have been reported in recent history.

1883
A small fissure eruption took place from Lingao cone in the Lingao area sometime in 1883.

1933
Another small fissure eruption took place from the Nansheling Ridge in the Chengmai area on June 26 (date accurate to within plus or minus 4 days), 1933. This eruption probably ended on July 8, 1933.

See also
 Haikou Volcanic Cluster Global Geopark

References

Volcanoes of China
Active volcanoes
Landforms of Hainan
Volcanic fields